The 1971 NCAA Men's Soccer Tournament was the thirteenth organized men's college soccer tournament by the National Collegiate Athletic Association, to determine the top college soccer team in the United States. The Howard Bison won their first national title by defeating the two-time defending champion Saint Louis Billikens in the championship game, 3–2. The final match was played on December 30, 1971, in Miami, Florida, at the Miami Orange Bowl. Howard's championship would later be vacated by the NCAA on disputed grounds of player eligibility.

This was the final championship before the establishment of separate championships for the NCAA's University Division (now Division I) and College Division (now Divisions II and III) in 1973.

Tournament

Final – Miami Orange Bowl, Miami, Florida 

The Championship was later vacated by the NCAA on the grounds that two Howard players had played amateur soccer in Trinidad, exhausting their eligibility, and that two others had not taken entrance exams, required by the NCAA, to predict a grade point average of at least 1.6. Howard University argued that the eligibility rules were vague and discriminated against foreigners, and that the players had all maintained grade-point averages of 3.0 or higher in college, but the NCAA did not reverse the ruling.

See also 
 1971 NAIA Soccer Championship

References 

Championship
NCAA Division I Men's Soccer Tournament seasons
NCAA
NCAA University Division Soccer Tournament
NCAA University Division Soccer Tournament
Soccer in Florida